Davaadorjiin Ganbold or Ganbold Davaadorj (born 1957 in Ulaanbaatar) is a prominent Mongolian economist and a politician from the Democratic Party known as Da.Ganbold. He was one of the lead figures in the Mongolian Revolution of 1990 and Mongolian Democratic Union of the late 1980s and early 1990s. In 1990, Ganbold was elected as the Chairman of the Mongolian National Progress Party, which later merged to establish the Mongolian National Democratic Party. Mongolian National Democratic Party was one of the founding members of the current Democratic Party of Mongolia. Ganbold was appointed as the first Deputy Prime Minister of Mongolia between 1990 and 1992.

Ganbold Davaadorj was elected as the Member of Parliament known as the State Great Hural of Mongolia between 1992 and 2000. Ganbold was the Chairman of the Parliament's Economic Policy Standing Committee from 1996 to 2000. He is considered to be one of the main people behind the Mongolian economic reforms of the early 1990s. In 1998 he was nominated for the position of Prime Minister of Mongolia five times between July 24 and the end of August of that year, and rejected by President Natsagiin Bagabandi on each occasion.

In the end the Democratic Union gave up on getting Ganbold in as Prime Minister and instead nominated Janlavyn Narantsatsralt, whom was approved by the President of Mongolia.

Ganbold is closely connected with the Buryat Mongol people.

Early life and education (1957–1987) 

Ganbold Davaadorj was born on June 26, 1957 in Ulaanbaatar to L. Oyun and Davaadorj Tsedevsuren. The first of the 3 siblings, he has two sisters. Oyun, his mother, was a doctor. Ganbold's father Davaadorj is a prominent Mongolian economist and until 2016 he served as a professor at the University of Finance and Economics. Davaadorj, who was a close advisor to Yumjaagiin Tsedenbal, was the official representative of Mongolia in Moscow for the Comecon.

Ganbold grew up with and was very close to his grandfather Lodon Gotov, who was one of first neurologists in Mongolia, and established the very first modern soum hospitals in Tosontsengel, Aldarkhaan and Tonkhil soums of Zavkhan and Govi-Altai provinces. Soon after his grandfather passed away in 1966, Ganbold moved to Moscow with his parents, where he studied in a middle school.

In 1979, Ganbold graduated Moscow State University (MSU) with a master's degree in economics. After graduation, he joined National University of Mongolia as a lecturer of economics. Later, Ganbold went back to Moscow State University and graduated with Doctor of Philosophy degree in economics in 1987. He continued to teach at the National University of Mongolia until 1990.

Early political career (1987–1990)

Deputy Prime Minister (1990-1992)

Member of the Parliament (1992-2000)

References

Sources 
 Nizam U. Ahmed and Philip Norton. Parliaments in Asia. p. 155-156.

Living people
1957 births
Members of the State Great Khural
Government ministers of Mongolia
Democratic Party (Mongolia) politicians
Moscow State University alumni
People from Ulaanbaatar
Deputy Prime Ministers of Mongolia